The Company Man is a book written by Robert Jackson Bennett and published by Orbit Books (now owned by Hachette Book Group) on 11 April 2011 which later went on to win the Edgar Award for Best Paperback Original in 2012.

References 

Edgar Award-winning works
2011 American novels
2011 science fiction novels
Orbit Books books